Karunamaya Goswami (11 March 1943 – 30 June 2017) was a Bangladeshi musicologist and litterateur. He was awarded Ekushey Padak in 2012 by the Government of Bangladesh for his contribution to music research. He is known as a Nazrul Geeti exponent.

Education

Goswami completed his Ph.D. on the topic "Bangla Kavyageetir Dharay Kazi Nazrul Islam-er Sthan, Contribution of Kazi Nazrul Islam to the development of Bengali music" from the University of Dhaka in 1987.

Works

 Aspects of Nazrul Songs (1990)
 Kazi Nazrul Islam: A Profile (1990) 
 Introducing Kazi Nazrul Islam (1999)
 Rabindranath-er Palestine Bhabna O Onnanyo (2006) 
 Stories of Africa (1975)

Awards
 Nazrul Memorial Gold Medal and Award (1987)
 Bangla Academy Literary Award (2009)
 Ekushey Padak (2012)
 Tagore Award by Bangla Academy (2013)

References

1942 births
2017 deaths
University of Dhaka alumni
Recipients of the Ekushey Padak
Recipients of Bangla Academy Award
Bangladeshi male writers